Hellingly was a railway station on the now closed Polegate to Eridge line (the Cuckoo Line) in East Sussex.  It served the village of Hellingly.

History
The station was opened by the London, Brighton and South Coast Railway on 5 April 1880  It was on the line extension from Hailsham to Eridge. 
The station closed to passenger traffic on 14 June 1965 but freight trains continued to pass through until 1968 when the line was closed completely.

Hellingly Hospital Railway
There was also a separate platform for passengers visiting Hellingly Hospital by tram, until 1933, the passenger service via Tramcar being discontinued from 1931. The line, known as the Hellingly Hospital Railway continued in use for transporting coal wagons from Hellingly Station for use at the Hospital until 1959.

Film
The station featured in the 1964 film Smokescreen. The two investigators visited the station and met the station master, who said that the whole line would be closed the following year. There are some excellent shots along the platform towards the road bridge. Also clearly visible is one of the 3-car stop marks put in on this line for the Class 207 'Oxted' diesel units.

Present day
The station building survives today as a private residence, complete with canopy. The "Cuckoo Trail" public footpath and cycleway now runs along the trackbed.

See also 

 List of closed railway stations in Britain

References

External links 
 Disused stations

Disused railway stations in East Sussex
Former London, Brighton and South Coast Railway stations
Railway stations in Great Britain opened in 1880
Railway stations in Great Britain closed in 1965
Beeching closures in England
Thomas Myres buildings
railway station